Liobagrus nigricauda is a species of catfish in the family Amblycipitidae (the torrent catfishes). It is endemic to Lake Dianchi in China. This species grows to a length of  TL.

References 

Liobagrus
Endemic fauna of Yunnan
Freshwater fish of China
Fish described in 1904
Taxa named by Charles Tate Regan
Taxonomy articles created by Polbot